Mohammed bin Salman Al Saud (born 31 August 1985), colloquially known by his initials MBS or MbS, is Crown Prince and Prime Minister of Saudi Arabia. He also serves as the chairman of the Council of Economic and Development Affairs and chairman of the Council of Political and Security Affairs. He is considered the de facto ruler of Saudi Arabia, being deemed as such even before his appointment as prime minister in 2022. He served as minister of defense from 2015 to 2022. He is the seventh son of King Salman.

Mohammed was born as the first child of Prince Salman bin Abdulaziz and his third wife, Fahda bint Falah Al Hithlain. After obtaining a law degree from King Saud University, he served as an advisor to his father. After his father became king, Mohammed was appointed defense minister and deputy crown prince in 2015. He was promoted to crown prince after the dismissal of Crown Prince Muhammad bin Nayef, King Salman's nephew, in 2017. Salman ceded the position of prime minister to Mohammed in 2022.

Mohammed rules an authoritarian government. There are no democratic institutions in Saudi Arabia, and elements of repression are evident. Islamic scholars, human rights activists, women's rights activists, journalists, former insiders, Islamists, and other political dissidents are systematically repressed through tactics including torture and jailing, and some reports have stated that Mohammed uses a group known as the Tiger Squad to carry out extrajudicial killings. He was personally linked to the assassination of Jamal Khashoggi, a Saudi Arabian Washington Post columnist who had criticised the Saudi government, but he has denied involvement in the killing. Mohammed was the architect of Saudi Arabian-led intervention in Yemen which has exacerbated the humanitarian crisis and famine there. His government was also involved in the escalation of the Qatar diplomatic crisis, the 2017 detention of Lebanese prime minister Saad Hariri, a 2018 diplomatic spat with Canada, the arrest of Saudi princes and billionaires in 2017, the 2018–2019 Saudi crackdown on feminists, an alleged phone hack against Amazon chairman Jeff Bezos in 2019, and treason charges against his cousin and rival Muhammad bin Nayef in 2020. Saudi Arabia's relations with the Biden Administration have been strained, especially after Mohammed's refusal to increase oil production in the wake of 2022 Russian invasion of Ukraine.

Mohammed has touted reforms in an effort to rebrand his regime's image internationally and within the kingdom. These include regulations restricting the powers of the religious police and improving women's rights, such as the removal of the ban on female drivers in 2018 and weakening the male-guardianship system in 2019. Other cultural developments under his reign include the first Saudi public concerts by a female singer, the first Saudi sports stadium to admit women, an increased presence of women in the workforce, and opening the country to international tourists by introducing an e-visa system, allowing foreign visas to be applied for and issued via the Internet. The Saudi Vision 2030 program aims to diversify the country's economy through investment in non-oil sectors including technology and tourism. Under Mohammed, Saudi Arabia started co-ordinating its energy policy with Russia since 2016, and also strengthened its relations with China, signing a comprehensive strategic partnership with Xi Jinping in 2022.

Early life
Mohammed bin Salman was born on 31 August 1985 to Prince Salman bin Abdulaziz and his third spouse, Fahda bint Falah Al Hithlain. Fahda is a granddaughter of Rakan bin Hithlain and great-granddaughter of Dhaydan bin Hithlain, who were heads of the Al Ajman tribe. In 1915 the Al Ajman tribe, under Dhaydan's leadership, fought against the Al Saud, during which Salman's uncle Saad bin Abdul Rahman was killed in the battle of Kanzan.

Mohammed is the eldest among his mother's six children and is the eighth child and seventh son of his father. His full siblings include Prince Turki and Prince Khalid. Mohammed holds a bachelor's degree in law from King Saud University.

Early career
After graduating from university, Mohammed spent several years in the private sector before becoming a personal aide to his father. He worked as a consultant for the Experts Commission, working for the Saudi Cabinet. On 15 December 2009, at the age of 24, he entered politics as a special advisor to his father when the latter was the governor of Riyadh Province. At this time Mohammed began to rise from one position to another, such as secretary-general of the Riyadh Competitive Council, special advisor to the chairman of the board for the King Abdulaziz Foundation for Research and Archives, and a member of the board of trustees for Albir Society in the Riyadh region. In October 2011, Crown Prince Sultan bin Abdulaziz died. Prince Salman began his ascent to power by becoming second deputy prime minister and minister of defence. He made Mohammed his private advisor.

Chief of the Court

In June 2012, Crown Prince Nayef bin Abdulaziz died. Prince Mohammed moved up into the number two position in the hierarchy, as his father became the new crown prince and first deputy prime minister. He soon began remaking the court in his own image. On 2 March 2013, Chief of the Crown Prince Court Saud bin Nayef Al Saud was appointed governor of the Eastern Province, and Mohammed succeeded him as chief of the court. He was also given the rank of minister. On 25 April 2014, Mohammed was appointed state minister.

Rise to power

Minister of Defence

On 23 January 2015, King Abdullah died and Salman ascended the throne. Prince Mohammed was appointed minister of defence and secretary general of the royal court. In addition, he retained his post as the minister of state.

In Yemen, the political unrest (which began escalating in 2011) rapidly became a major issue for the newly appointed minister of defence, with Houthis taking control of northern Yemen in late 2014, followed by the resignation of President Abdrabbuh Mansur Hadi and his cabinet. Mohammed's first move as minister was to mobilise a pan-GCC coalition to intervene following a series of suicide bombings in the Yemeni capital Sana'a via air strikes against Houthis, and impose a naval blockade. In March 2015, Saudi Arabia began leading a coalition of countries allied against the Houthi rebels. While there was agreement among those Saudi princes heading security services regarding the necessity of a response to the Houthis' seizure of Sana'a, which had forced the Yemeni government into exile, Mohammed launched the intervention without full coordination across security services. Saudi National Guard minister Mutaib bin Abdullah Al Saud, who was out of the country, was left out of the loop of operations. While Mohammed sold the war as a quick win on Houthi rebels in Yemen and a way to put President Hadi back in power, however, it became a long war of attrition.

In April 2015, King Salman appointed his nephew Muhammad bin Nayef as crown prince and his son Mohammed as deputy crown prince. In late 2015, at a meeting between his father and U.S. president Barack Obama, Mohammed bin Salman broke protocol to deliver a monologue criticising U.S. foreign policy. When he announced an anti-terrorist military alliance of Islamic countries in December 2015, some of the countries involved said they had not been consulted.

Regarding his role in the military intervention, Mohammed gave his first on-the-record interview on 4 January 2016 to The Economist, which had called him the "architect of the war in Yemen". Denying the title, he explained the mechanism of the decision-making institutions actually holding stakes in the intervention, including the council of security and political affairs and the ministry of foreign affairs from the Saudi side. He added that the Houthis usurped power in Sana'a before he served as minister of defence.

In response to the threat from ISIL, Mohammed established the Islamic Military Counter Terrorism Coalition (IMCTC), a Saudi-led Islamic alliance against terrorism, in December 2015. The IMCTC's first meeting took place in Riyadh in November 2017 and involved defence ministers and officials from 41 countries.

Crown prince
Mohammed was appointed crown prince on 21 June 2017, following the King's decision to depose Muhammad bin Nayef and make his own son the heir to the throne. The change of succession had been predicted in December 2015 by an unusually blunt and public memo published by the German Federal Intelligence Service, which was subsequently rebuked by the German government.

On the day Mohammed bin Salman became crown prince, U.S. president Donald Trump called him to "congratulate him on his recent elevation". Trump and Mohammed pledged "close cooperation" on security and economic issues, according to the White House, and the two leaders also discussed the need to cut off support for terrorism, the recent diplomatic dispute with Qatar, and the push to secure peace between Israel and the Palestinians. Mohammed told The Washington Post in April 2017 that without America's cultural influence on Saudi Arabia, "we would have ended up like North Korea."

2017 purge

In May 2017, Mohammed publicly warned "I confirm to you, no one will survive in a corruption case—whoever he is, even if he's a prince or a minister". In November 2017, he ordered some 200 wealthy businessmen and princes to be placed under house arrest in The Ritz-Carlton, Riyadh. On 4 November 2017, the Saudi press announced the arrest of the Saudi prince and billionaire Al-Waleed bin Talal, a frequent English-language news commentator and a major shareholder in Citi, News Corp and Twitter, as well as over 40 princes and government ministers at the behest of the Crown Prince on corruption and money laundering charges.

Others arrested or fired in the purge included Prince Mutaib bin Abdullah, head of the Saudi Arabian National Guard; Minister of Economy and Planning Adel Fakeih; and the commander of the Royal Saudi Navy, Admiral Abdullah bin Sultan bin Mohammed Al-Sultan.

Those arrested in the Ritz Carlton were the subject of what became called "the night of beating". Most were beaten, and some were tied to walls in stress positions as part of torture by Saudi agents. The interrogators knew very little outside of the victims' assets within Saudi Arabia and wanted to know more about their off-shore holdings, while the victims did not know why they were detained. The detainees were threatened with blackmail. At one point, the interrogators told the victims to contact their bank managers in Geneva and elsewhere and ask for large sums of money, and were surprised due to their inexpertise that the assets were not entirely in cash. Swiss banks identified some of the transactions as under duress and were able to stop some of them. During the proceedings, there was no due process nor plea bargains. U.S. officials described the actions as "coercion, abuse, and torture". Detainees were denied sleep, had their heads covered, and were beaten. Seventeen had to be hospitalised. After many days, the remaining detainees were moved to Al-Ha'ir Prison, while some released are banned from travelling abroad.

One hypothesis for the arrests was that they were part of a power grab on the part of Prince Mohammed. The New York Times wrote:
 Writing for The Huffington Post, University of Delaware professor of Islam and Global Affairs, Muqtedar Khan, speculated as to whether the removal of Al-Waleed bin Talal, a critic of Donald Trump, amounted to a coup. BBC correspondent Frank Gardner was quoted as saying that "Prince Mohammed is moving to consolidate his growing power while spearheading a reform programme". Yet "[i]t is not clear what those detained are suspected of."

Another hypothesis was that the purge was part of a move towards reform. Steven Mufson of The Washington Post argues that Mohammed "knows that only if he can place the royal family under the law, and not above as it was in the past, can he ask the whole country to change their attitudes relative to taxes [and] subsidies." An analysis from the CBC claimed that "the clampdown against corruption resonates with ordinary Saudis who feel that the state has been asking them to accept belt tightening while, at the same time, they see corruption and the power elite accumulating more wealth". Mohammed's reform agenda is widely popular with Saudi Arabia's burgeoning youth population, but faces resistance from some of the old guard more comfortable with the kingdom's traditions of incremental change and rule by consensus. According to a former British ambassador to Riyadh, Mohammed "is the first prince in modern Saudi history whose constituency has not been within the royal family, it's outside it. It's been young Saudis, particularly younger Saudi men in the street". The 2018 Arab Youth Survey found that nine out of ten 18–24 year-olds in the MENA region support Mohammed's campaign against corruption.

Robert W. Jordan, former U.S. ambassador to Saudi Arabia, said that "certainly Saudi Arabia has had a corruption problem for many years. I think the population, especially, has been very unhappy with princes coming in and grabbing business deals, with public funds going to flood control projects that never seem to get built... I would also say it's a classical power grab move sometimes to arrest your rivals, your potential rivals under the pretext of corruption".

Trump expressed support for the move, tweeting "I have great confidence in King Salman and the Crown Prince of Saudi Arabia, they know exactly what they are doing....Some of those they are harshly treating have been 'milking' their country for years!" French president Emmanuel Macron, who visited Riyadh days after the purge, when asked about the purge stated "this is not the role of a president, and similarly I would not expect a leader of a foreign country to come and infringe on domestic matters."

On 30 January 2019, the Saudi government announced the conclusion of the Anti-Corruption Committee's work. According to the Corruption Perceptions Index, Saudi Arabia is slowly improving its public sector, while figures of 2016 indicated a score of 46, whereby 0 implies a highly corrupt score and 100 a clear one, the index gives Saudi Arabia a score of 49 in 2017 and 2018, and 53 in 2019 the highest score achieved by Saudi Arabia until now.

Prime minister
On 27 September 2022, Mohammed was appointed as prime minister of Saudi Arabia by King Salman. Traditionally, the king has held the title of prime minister.

Administration

Ideology 
Mohammed's ideology has been described as nationalist and populist, with a conservative attitude towards politics, and a liberal stance on economic and social issues. It has been heavily influenced by the views of his former adviser Saud al-Qahtani and the ruler of Abu Dhabi, Mohammed bin Zayed. His style of ruling has been described as extremely brutal by journalist Rula Jebreal and authoritarian by Jamal Khashoggi and Theodor Winkler.

Authoritarianism 
Mohammed heads a repressive authoritarian government in Saudi Arabia. Human rights activists and women's rights activists in Saudi Arabia routinely face abuse and torture by the regime. Critics, journalists and former insiders are tortured and killed. The government has targeted Saudi dissidents who are located abroad, most famously Jamal Khashoggi, a columnist of The Washington Post, who was murdered by the regime. Mohammed has justified the mass arrests of human rights activists as being as necessary for enacting reforms in Saudi Arabia.

Mohammed has increasingly consolidated power in Saudi Arabia during his tenure as leader. He significantly restricted the powers of the Saudi religious police. On 29 January 2015, Mohammed was named the chair of the newly established Council for Economic and Development Affairs, replacing the disbanded Supreme Economic Commission. In April 2015, Mohammed was given control over Saudi Aramco by royal decree following his appointment as deputy crown prince.

Domestic policies

Religious policy
According to David Ottaway of the Wilson Center, "[o]f all [Mohammed's] domestic reforms," the most "consequential" has been his work limiting the influence of Saudi Wahhabi clergy, "who still command millions of followers in the country and beyond". Mohammed's inviting of "a constant stream of Western male and female singers, bands, dancers and even American female wrestlers" to perform in Saudi Arabia is in complete conflict with religious conservatives who have spoken "against the opening up of the kingdom to secular Western culture". Journalist Graeme Wood writes, "it is hard to exaggerate how drastically this sidelining of Islamic law will change Saudi Arabia." Gabriella Perez argues that the new social changes implemented by MBS are oriented towards secularist repression, with the potential to adversely impact freedom of religion in the country.

Restrictions on religious police
In 2016, Mohammed took steps to drastically curtail the powers of the "Committee for the Promotion of Virtue and the Prevention of Vice" (CPVPV), or Islamic religious police. The "feared" CPVPV, which had thousands of officers on the streets and powers to arrest, detain, and interrogate those suspected of violating of sharia,  and it was banned "from pursuing, questioning, asking for identification, arresting and detaining anyone suspected of a crime".

Alterations to Islamic theology and secularization of legal system
Mohammed states that "in Islamic law, the head of the Islamic establishment is wali al-amr (Arabic: وَلِيّ الأمر ), the ruler. While Saudi rulers "have historically stayed away from religion", and "outsourced" issues of theology and religious law to "the big beards", traditionally conservative and orthodox religious scholars, Mohammed has "a law degree from King Saud University" and "flaunts his knowledge and dominance over the clerics", according to Graeme Wood. He is "probably the only leader in the Arab world who knows anything about Islamic epistemology and jurisprudence", according to (secular) scholar of Islamic law Bernard Haykel. In an interview televised in Saudi Arabia on 25 April 2021, Mohammed criticised the devotion of Saudi religious leaders to Wahhabi doctrines "in language never before used by a Saudi monarch", saying "there are no fixed schools of thought and there is no infallible person", and that fatwas "should be based on the time, place and mindset in which they are issued", rather than regarded as immutable.

In interviews with Wood, Mohammedexplained that Islamic law is based on two textual sources: the Quran and the Sunnah, or the example of the Prophet Muhammad, gathered in many tens of thousands of fragments from the Prophet's life and sayings. Certain rules—not many—come from the unambiguous legislative content of the Quran, he said, and he cannot do anything about them even if he wants to. But those sayings of the Prophet (called Hadith), he explained, do not all have equal value as sources of law, and he said he is bound by only a very small number whose reliability, 1,400 years later, is unimpeachable. Every other source of Islamic law, he said, is open to interpretation—and he is therefore entitled to interpret them as he sees fit.

The effect of this maneuver is to chuck about 95 percent of Islamic law into the sandpit of Saudi history and leave MBS free to do whatever he wants. "He's short-circuiting the tradition," Haykel said. "But he's doing it in an Islamic way. He's saying that there

As of early 2021, Prince Mohammed has "ordered a codification of Saudi laws that would end the power of individual Wahhabi judges to implement" their own interpretation of Sharia. According to Wood, many conservative clerics strongly appear to have succumbed to "good old-fashioned intimidation" by the government to reverse their religious positions and supporting the government line on issues such as "the opening of cinemas and mass layoffs of Wahhabi imams".

Abaya ban 
In December 2022, Saudi Arabia's Education and Training Evaluation Commission (ETEC) declared a governmental ban on Muslim female students from wearing the traditional abaya clothing to examination centres; insisting that students should wear only school uniforms. A later clarification from ETEC reported by The Milli Chronicle stated that the ban on abayas was restricted only for all-female examination centres run by the ETEC.

Economic policy

Vision 2030 

Mohammed took the leadership in the restructuring of Saudi Arabia's economy, which he officially announced in April 2016 when he introduced Vision 2030, the country's strategic orientation for the next 15 years. Vision 2030 plans to reform Saudi Arabia's economy towards a more diversified and privatised structure. It details goals and measures in various fields, from developing non-oil revenues and privatisation of the economy to e-government and sustainable development.

One of the major motives behind this economic restructure through Vision 2030 can be traced back to Saudi Arabia's reliance on a rentier economy, as a limit on oil resources makes its sustainability a problem in the future. While the country claims to own a proven reserve of 266.58 billion barrels of crude oil, the energy analyst Matthew R. Simmons estimates the true number to be far less, as the last non-Saudi report by the General Accounting Office in 1978 only mentioned 110 billion barrels.

At the inaugural Future Investment Initiative conference in Riyadh in October 2017, Mohammed announced plans for the creation of Neom, a $500 billion economic zone to cover an area of 26,000 square kilometres on Saudi Arabia's Red Sea coast, extending into Jordan and Egypt. Neom aims to attract investment in sectors including renewable energy, biotechnology (especially genetically modified agriculture), robotics and advanced manufacturing. The announcement followed plans to develop a 34,000 square kilometre area across a lagoon of 50 islands on Saudi Arabia's Red Sea coastline into a luxury tourism destination with laws on a par with international standards. In a further effort to boost the tourism industry, in November 2017 it was announced that Saudi Arabia would start issuing tourist visas for foreigners, beginning in 2018.

Mohammed's biggest bet was his plan to restore Saudi dominance in global oil markets by driving the new competition into bankruptcy, by keeping the oil price low enough for a long enough period. Saudi Arabia persuaded OPEC to do the same. A few small players went bankrupt, but American frackers only shut down their less-profitable operations temporarily, and waited for oil prices to go up again. Saudi Arabia, which had been spending $100 billion a year to keep services and subsidies going, had to admit defeat in November 2016. It then cut production significantly and asked its OPEC partners to do the same.

In the last week of September 2018, Mohammed inaugurated the much-awaited $6.7bn high-speed railway line connecting Mecca and Medina, the two holiest cities of Islam. The Haramain Express is 450 km line travelling up to 300 km/h that can transport around 60 million passengers annually. The commercial operations of the railway began on 11 October 2018.

In October 2018, Mohammed announced that the Public Investment Fund of Saudi Arabia's assets were approaching $400 billion and would pass $600 billion by 2020.

Mohammed announced a project to build Saudi Arabia's first nuclear reactor in November 2018. The kingdom aims to build 16 nuclear facilities over the next 20 years. Efforts to diversify the Saudi energy sector also include wind and solar, including a 1.8 gigawatt solar plant announced in the same month as part of a long-term project in partnership with SoftBank.

Saudi petroleum industry 

Saudi Arabia, OPEC's largest producer, has the second-largest amount of oil reserves in the world. On 28 September 2021, U.S. president Joe Biden's national security adviser, Jake Sullivan, met with Mohammed in Saudi Arabia to discuss the high oil prices. In October 2022 in protest of Saudi Arabia cutting oil production, U.S. National Security Council spokesman John Kirby said Saudi Arabia knew the cut would "increase Russian revenues and blunt the effectiveness of sanctions" and accused Saudi Arabia of "coercing" other oil producing countries to agree. The record-high energy prices were driven by a global surge in demand as the world quit the economic recession caused by COVID-19, particularly due to strong energy demand in Asia.

The relations between Russia and Saudi Arabia evolved under Mohammed, granting the two nations the ability to conspire in oil export decisions.

Domestic reforms 
Mohammed established an entertainment authority that began hosting comedy shows, professional wrestling events, and monster truck rallies. In 2016, he shared his idea for "Green cards" for non-Saudi foreigners with Al Arabiya journalist Turki Aldakhil. In 2019 the Saudi cabinet approved a new residency scheme (Premium Residency) for foreigners. The scheme will enable expatriates to permanently reside, own property and invest in the Kingdom.

The first measures undertaken in April 2016 included new taxes and cuts in subsidies, a diversification plan, the creation of a $2 trillion Saudi sovereign wealth fund, and a series of strategic economic reforms called the National Transformation Programme. Mohammed's plans to raise capital for the sovereign wealth fund included selling off shares of Saudi Aramco, the state-owned petroleum and natural gas company, with the capital to be re-invested in other sectors such as to implement the diversification plans. In October 2017, the plan for Aramco's IPO listing was criticised by The Economist, which called it "a mess". Mohammed slashed the state budget, freezing government contracts and reducing the pay of civil employees as part of drastic austerity measures.

In April 2017, Mohammed announced a project to build one of the world's largest cultural, sports and entertainment cities in Al Qiddiya, southwest of Riyadh. The plans for a 334-square kilometre city include a safari and a Six Flags theme park.

In October 2017, Mohammed said that the ultra-conservative Saudi state had not been "normal" for the past 30 years, blaming rigid doctrines that had governed society in a reaction to the Iranian Revolution, which successive leaders "didn't know how to deal with". He stated that he aimed to have Saudi Arabia start "returning to what we were before—a country of moderate Islam that is open to all religions and to the world". This amounted to telling the country's clerics that the deal the royal family struck with them after the Grand Mosque seizure was to be renegotiated. Building an industrial culture was seen as incompatible with Wahhabism. The Wahhabis were committed to fixed social and gender relationships. These were consistent with an economy built on oil sales, but industrialization requires a dynamic culture with social relations constantly shifting. The regime's commitment to "moderate Islam" and secularization drive through repressive methods has been questioned.

Further cultural transformations followed in December 2017 with Saudi Arabia's first public concert by a female singer, and in January 2018 a sports stadium in Jeddah became the first in the Kingdom to admit women. In April 2018, the first public cinema opened in Saudi Arabia after a ban of 35 years, with plans to have more than 2,000 screens running by 2030.

In an interview with a CBS 60 Minutes that aired on 29 September 2019, Mohammed invited people to visit the kingdom to see the transformation, asking for people to meet Saudi citizens for themselves.

On 26 April 2020, the Supreme Judicial Council of Saudi Arabia abolished flogging as a punishment in the country, stating that the decision was "an extension of the human rights reforms introduced under the direction of King Salman and the direct supervision of Crown Prince Mohammed bin Salman". The following day, the Human Rights Commission of Saudi Arabia reported the enactment of a royal decree abolishing the death penalty for crimes committed by minors.

Human rights 

Early in his leadership tenure, Mohammed sought to cultivate an image of Saudi Arabia as implementing various reforms. Human rights groups say that repression has worsened under his tenure. According to human rights groups, arrests of human rights activists have risen under Mohammed. He has reportedly created the Tiger Squad, a team of assassins that act as a death squad, to target Saudi critics inside and outside Saudi Arabia. Among those detained in a wave of arrests in September 2017 were Abdulaziz al-Shubaily, a founding member of the Saudi Civil and Political Rights Association (ACPRA); Mustafa al-Hassan, an academic and novelist; and Essam al-Zamel, an entrepreneur. Ahead of the lifting of the ban on women driving in June 2018, 17 women's rights activists were arrested, including the women to drive and anti-male guardianship campaigner Loujain al-Hathloul. Eight of the 17 were subsequently released. Hatoon al-Fassi, an associate professor of women's history at King Saud University, was arrested shortly afterwards.

In August that year, the human rights activist Israa al-Ghomgham and her husband, both arrested in 2015, were put under legal threat of beheading. Human Rights Watch warned that the al-Ghomgham case set a "dangerous precedent" for other women activists currently detained. HRW's Middle East director Sarah Leah Whitson said, "Any execution is appalling, but seeking the death penalty for activists like Israa al-Ghomgham, who are not even accused of violent behaviour, is monstrous. Every day, the Saudi monarchy's unrestrained despotism makes it harder for its public relations teams to spin the fairy tale of 'reform' to allies and international business." On 23 April 2019, 37 people, mostly Shia human rights activists involved in the Qatif conflict, were executed in one of the largest mass executions of the minority sect in the kingdom's history.

In August 2019, Loujain al-Hathloul's brother Walid informed that his sister was offered release on denying the human rights abuses committed against her in Saudi prison. Walid wrote on Twitter that the Saudi state security laid a proposal for Loujain to sign a document and appear on camera to deny that she had been tortured and sexually harassed in jail. He stated that Loujain mentioned to the family that she had been whipped, beaten, electrocuted in a chair, and harassed by masked men, who would wake her up in the middle of the night to shout threats at her in cell. Walid also tweeted that Loujain refused the offer proposed by Saudi authorities and "immediately ripped the document".

In response to foreign criticism and women's rights activism, Mohammed has implemented modest reforms to improve women's rights in Saudi Arabia. In September 2017, he implemented the women to drive movement's multi-decade demand to lift the ban on female drivers. He legislated against some elements of Saudi Arabia's Wali system, also a topic of a decades-long campaign by women's rights activists. In response to the Saudi anti male-guardianship campaign, the Saudi government enacted a law that allows women above 21 years old to obtain passports and travel abroad without needing the permission of their male guardians. In February 2018, it became legally possible for Saudi women to open their own business without a male's permission. According to the Saudi Information Ministry, mothers in Saudi Arabia became authorised to retain immediate custody of their children after divorce without having to file any lawsuits.

In February 2017, Saudi Arabia appointed its first woman to head the Saudi Stock Exchange.

Arrest of Muhammad bin Nayef 
Former Saudi crown prince Muhammad bin Nayef was arrested on 6 March 2020, along with his half-brother Nawwaf bin Nayef and King Salman's brother Prince Ahmed bin Abdulaziz. The three princes were charged with treason. The Saudi government claimed the princes were trying to overthrow Mohammed bin Salman.

Accusations of poisoning attempt against King Abdullah 
In 2021, the former Saudi intelligence official Saad al-Jabri said in an interview with CBS that Mohammed bin Salman mentioned to Interior Minister Muhammad bin Nayef Al Saud plans to kill King Abdullah in 2014. This would allow then-crown prince Salman bin Abdulaziz, Prince Mohammed's father, to take the throne. Al-Jabri has called Mohammed "a psychopath, killer ... with infinite resources, who poses threat to his people, to the Americans and to the planet". The prince has rejected all allegations; the Saudi embassy called al-Jabri "a discredited former government official with a long history of [fabrication]".

Foreign policy

Interventions in Syria and Yemen 

Some have called Mohammed the architect of the war in Yemen. On 10 January 2016, The Independent reported that "the BND, the German intelligence agency, portrayed...Saudi defence minister and Deputy Crown Prince Mohammed bin Salman...as a political gambler who is destabilising the Arab world through proxy wars in Yemen and Syria." German officials reacted to the BND's memo, saying the published statement "is not the position of the federal government".

Mohammed leads the Saudi-led intervention in Yemen against the Houthi rebels, who in 2015 seized Sana'a and ousted the Saudi-backed Hadi government, ending multilateral efforts towards a political settlement following the 2011 Yemeni uprising. Coalition airstrikes during the intervention have resulted in thousands of civilians killed or injured, prompting accusations of war crimes in the intervention. Following a Houthi missile attack against Riyadh in December 2017, which was intercepted by Saudi air defence, airstrikes killed 136 Yemeni civilians and injured 87 others in eleven days. In August 2018, the United Nations reported that all parties in the conflict were responsible for human rights violations and for actions which could be considered war crimes.

The war and blockade of Yemen has cost Saudi Arabia tens of billions of dollars, further aggravated the humanitarian crisis in the country and destroyed much of Yemen's infrastructure, but failed to dislodge the Shiite Houthi rebels and their allies from the Yemeni capital. More than 50,000 children in Yemen died from starvation in 2017. From 2015 to May 2019 the number of total deaths of children is said to be approximately 85,000. The famine in Yemen is the direct result of the Saudi-led intervention and blockade of the rebel-held area. In October 2018, Lise Grande, the United Nations Humanitarian Coordinator for Yemen, warned that 12 to 13 million Yemenis were at risk of starvation if the war continued for another three months. On 28 March 2018, Saudi Arabia, along with its coalition partner the UAE, donated US$930 million to the United Nations which, according to UN secretary-general António Guterres, "...(will) help to alleviate the suffering of millions of vulnerable people across Yemen". The funds cover almost one-third of the $2.96 billion required to implement the UN's 2018 Yemen Humanitarian Response Plan. Following the Houthi missile attack against Riyadh in December 2017, which was intercepted by Saudi air defence, Mohammed retaliated with a ten-day barrage of indiscriminate airstrikes against civilian areas in Yemen held by Houthi forces, killing dozens of children.

In August 2018, a report by The Intercept cited unnamed sources claiming that former U.S. secretary of state Rex Tillerson had in June 2017 intervened to stop a Saudi-Emirati plan to invade Qatar, resulting in increased pressure from Saudi Arabia and the UAE for his removal from office.

Following the assassination of Jamal Khashoggi, the United States Senate Committee on Foreign Relations approved a resolution to impose sanctions on people blocking humanitarian access in Yemen and suspend arms sales to Saudi Arabia. Senator Lindsey Graham said America's relationship with Saudi Arabia "is more of a burden than an asset." He also said, "The crown prince [of Saudi Arabia] is so toxic, so tainted, so flawed."

Andrew Smith, of Campaign Against Arms Trade (CAAT), said that British foreign secretaries Boris Johnson and Jeremy Hunt "have played an utterly central and complicit role in arming and supporting the Saudi-led destruction of Yemen." Hunt's Conservative leadership campaign was partly funded by a close associate to Prince Mohammed.

On 16 August 2020, a lawsuit filed by a former top intelligence official, Saad al-Jabri, revealed that in 2015 Mohammed secretly called for Russia to intervene in Syria at a time when Bashar al-Assad's regime was close to falling apart. The Saudi monarchy had been supporting anti-Assad rebels, while Russians were bombing rebel-held cities in support of Assad, killing tens of thousands of Syrian civilians in the process. Western diplomats say that Mohammed was strongly influenced by Emirati politician Sheikh Mohammed bin Zayed Al Nahyan (who later became ruler of Abu Dhabi). The UAE was pushing for the idea of helping Russia stabilise Syria and enabling the Assad regime in the country. In 2017 it was reported that Saudi Arabia provided weapons to Syrian opposition groups, fighting against the Assad regime. Conflict Armament Research (CAR) reported that these weapons frequently ended up in the hands of the Islamic State members. In 2018, Mohammed reportedly wanted the U.S. military presence to maintain in Syria, despite President Donald Trump's declaring the withdrawal of American forces from the war-torn country.

Relations with Israel 
In December 2017, Mohammed criticised the United States' decision to recognise Jerusalem as the capital of Israel. In March 2018, he referred to Turkey as part of a "triangle of evil" alongside Iran and the Muslim Brotherhood. In 2018, he voiced his support for a Jewish homeland of Israel. This is the first time that a senior Saudi royal has expressed such sentiments publicly. In September 2019, Mohammed condemned Israeli prime minister Benjamin Netanyahu's plans to annex the eastern portion of the occupied West Bank known as the Jordan Valley.

Relationship with Russia 

Under Mohammed's leadership, Saudi Arabia strengthened its relationship with Russian leader Vladimir Putin. In 2016, Mohammed signed an agreement to cooperate with Russia in global oil markets. After Mohammed was accused of murdering Jamal Khashoggi, Putin was one of few world leaders to publicly embrace Mohammed. In 2021, Mohammed signed a military cooperation agreement with Russia.

Relations with Trump Administration 
In August 2016 Donald Trump Jr., the son of U.S. presidential candidate Donald Trump, had a meeting with an envoy representing Mohammed bin Salman and the crown prince of Abu Dhabi, Mohammed bin Zayed. The envoy offered help to the Trump campaign. The meeting included Joel Zamel, an Israeli specialist in social media manipulation, Lebanese-American businessman George Nader, and Blackwater founder Erik Prince.

Upon Trump's election, support for Mohammed bin Salman was described as one of the few issues where rival White House advisers Jared Kushner and Steve Bannon agreed. Mohammed, then deputy crown prince, was subsequently invited to the White House and given the treatment typically afforded to foreign heads of state by diplomatic protocol. He subsequently defended the Trump administration's travel ban for nationals of 7 Muslim-majority countries, stating that "Saudi Arabia does not believe that this measure is targeting Muslim countries or the religion of Islam". Kushner also inquired as to how the U.S. could support Mohammed in the succession process. After Mohammed became crown prince, President Trump reportedly said, "We've put our man on top". Trump initially supported the Saudi-led blockade of Qatar, despite opposition from U.S. secretary of state Rex Tillerson and Secretary of Defense James Mattis, though he later changed his position. Mohammed later reportedly claimed Kushner had provided intelligence assistance on domestic rivals to Mohammed during the 2017–19 Saudi Arabian purge, which Trump had personally expressed support for. The Trump administration also firmly supported Prince Mohammed during global backlash following the assassination of Jamal Khashoggi.

Relations with the Biden administration 

In 2019, during the Trump administration, Joe Biden criticised Mohammed, describing him as a pariah due to the 2018 killing of Saudi journalist Jamal Khashoggi. In July 2021, six months into the Biden presidency, Saudi deputy defence minister Khalid bin Salman Al Saud (Mohammed's brother) visited the United States. It was the first meeting between senior U.S. and Saudi officials after Jamal Khashoggi was murdered in 2018. In September 2021, Biden's national security adviser Jake Sullivan met with Mohammed. In the meeting, Mohammed ended up shouting at Sullivan after he raised the killing of Khashoggi.

After Russia invaded Ukraine in 2022, Saudi Arabia declined U.S. requests to increase oil production and thus undercut Russia's war finances. The Wall Street Journal wrote in April 2022 that the U.S.-Saudi relationship was at "its lowest point in decades." In April 2022, CIA director William Burns traveled to Saudi Arabia to meet with Mohammed, asking him to increase the country's oil production. They also discussed Saudi weapons purchases from China.

Relations between the United States and Saudi Arabia became weak after OPEC+ announced a  cut in oil production by two million barrels a day. The US government is angered by the move, accusing Saudi Arabia of siding with Russia in its war against Ukraine. The Saudi government denied these claims, claiming that the move was not politically motivated but to bring stability in global oil markets.

Severed ties with Qatar 

Reuters reported that Mohammed "said the dispute with Qatar could be long-lasting, comparing it to the U.S. embargo against Cuba imposed 60 years before, but played down its impact, dismissing the Gulf emirate as "smaller than a Cairo street". Saudi Arabia, the UAE, Egypt and Bahrain cut diplomatic and trade links with Qatar [in June 2017], suspending air and shipping routes with the world's biggest exporter of liquefied natural gas, which is home to the region's biggest U.S. military base."

Resignation of Saad Hariri 

In November 2017, Mohammed forced Lebanese prime minister Saad Hariri to resign when he visited Saudi Arabia. Mohammed believed that Hariri was in the pocket of Iran-backed Hezbollah, which is a major political force in Lebanon. Hariri eventually was released, went back to Lebanon and annulled his resignation.

Saudi–Canadian dispute

Chrystia Freeland, Canada's minister of foreign affairs, issued a statement via Twitter on 2 August 2018 expressing Canada's concern over the recent arrest of Samar Badawi, a human rights activist and sister of imprisoned Saudi blogger Raif Badawi, and called for the release of human rights activists. In response to Canada's criticism, Saudi Arabia expelled Canada's ambassador and froze trade with Canada. The Toronto Star reported that the consensus among analysts indicated that the actions taken by Mohammed were a "warning to the world — and to Saudi human rights activists — that his Saudi Arabia is not to be trifled with".

Assassination of Jamal Khashoggi 

In October 2018, Saudi journalist Jamal Khashoggi, a critic of Mohammed, went missing after entering the Saudi consulate in Istanbul. Turkish officials reportedly believe that Khashoggi was murdered at the consulate, claiming to have specific video and audio recordings proving that he was first tortured and then murdered, and that a medical forensics expert was part of the 15-man Saudi team seen entering and leaving the consulate at the time of the journalist's disappearance. Saudi Arabia denied the accusations and 13 days later Mohammed invited Turkish authorities to search the building as they "have nothing to hide". Saudi officials said they are "working to search for him". The Washington Post reported that Mohammed had earlier sought to lure Khashoggi back to Saudi Arabia and detain him.

According to Middle East Eye, seven of the fifteen men suspected of killing Khashoggi are members of Mohammed's personal bodyguard. John Sawers, a former head of the British MI6, stated that in his judgment of the evidence it is "very likely" that Mohammed ordered the killing of Khashoggi.

In the aftermath of Khashoggi's death, multiple commentators referred to Mohammed as "Mister Bone Saw", a play on the initials MBS. The name refers to the alleged use of a bone saw to dispose of Khashoggi's remains.

Mohammed has denied any involvement in the murder and blamed the assassination on rogue operators. However, Western countries are not convinced and believe this could not have happened without Mohammed's knowledge or approval. Donald Trump described the Saudi response to the killing as "one of the worst in the history of cover-ups." Trump also believes that Mohammed at least knew about the plan, saying that "the prince is running things over there more so at this stage."

After the murder, Mohammed's close confidant Ahmad Asiri was sacked, as was former advisor Saud al-Qahtani.

The recording of Khashoggi's killing collected by Turkish intelligence reportedly reveals that one of the members of the kill team instructed someone over the phone to "tell your boss, the deed was done." American intelligence officials believe that "boss" was a reference to the Crown Prince. The person who made the call was identified as Maher Abdulaziz Mutreb, a security officer who is frequently seen travelling with the prince.

Seven weeks after Khashoggi's death, Saudi Arabia, in order to "distance ... Crown Prince Mohammed bin Salman, from the grisly murder" stated it would pursue the death penalty for five suspects charged with "ordering and executing the crime."

On 16 November 2018, it was reported that the Central Intelligence Agency (CIA) had concluded with "high confidence" that Mohammed ordered Khashoggi's murder. The CIA based its conclusion on several pieces of evidence, including an intercepted conversation in which Mohammed's brother Khalid offered Khashoggi assurances that it would be safe for the journalist to enter Saudi Arabia's consulate in Istanbul. Although the CIA reportedly had not determined whether Khalid had any foreknowledge of Khashoggi's ultimate fate upon entering the consulate, it believed that Khalid conveyed this message to Khashoggi at Mohammed's behest. In the CIA's analysis, the killing was most likely motivated by Prince Mohammed's privately stated belief that Khashoggi was an Islamist with problematic connections to the Muslim Brotherhood, a perception that differs markedly from the Saudi government's public remarks on Khashoggi's death.

On 4 December 2018, a group of United States senators were briefed by CIA director Gina Haspel on the murder of Khashoggi. After the briefing, the senators were more than certain that Mohammed played a major role in the killing. Senator Lindsey Graham said, "You have to be willfully blind not to come to the conclusion that this was orchestrated and organised by people under the command of MBS and that he was intrinsically involved in the demise of Mr. Khashoggi." Senator Bob Corker said that the prince "ordered, monitored, the killing" and "If he were in front of a jury, he would be convicted of murder in about 30 minutes." On 5 December 2018, UN Human Rights chief Michelle Bachelet asked for an international investigation to determine who was behind Khashoggi's murder.

A former Saudi intelligence chief and senior member of the Saudi royal family, Prince Turki bin Faisal, dismissed the CIA's reported finding that Mohammed ordered the journalist's killing, saying that "The CIA has been proved wrong before. Just to mention the invasion of Iraq for example."

In March 2019, U.S. senators accused Saudi Arabia for a number of repetitive misdeeds and criticised Mohammed, saying he has gone "full gangster". The senators said the list of human rights violations by Saudi Arabia is too long to comprehend the situation in the kingdom or even work with Mohammed.

In June 2019, a UN report entitled "Annex to the Report of the Special Rapporteur on extrajudicial, summary or arbitrary executions: Investigation into the unlawful death of Mr. Jamal Khashoggi" linked Mohammed to the assassination.

In a June 2019 article, The Guardian claimed that after Khashoggi's assassination, the media group became a target of hacking attempts made by a Saudi cybersecurity subdivision, as per an internal order document obtained by the group, with Saud al-Qahtani undersigned. According to an interview in a PBS documentary film recorded in December 2018 and parts released in September 2019, Mohammed bears responsibility for the killing of Khashoggi since it happened under his watch but he denies any knowledge of the murder in advance. He denied in an interview with CBS' 60 Minutes aired on 29 September 2019 any personal involvement in the killing, adding that "once charges are proven against someone, regardless of their rank, it will be taken to court, no exception made", but said that he had to take "full responsibility for what happened".

On 25 February 2021, the Office of the Director of National Intelligence issued a declassified report approved by Director Avril Haines. The report, "Assessing the Saudi Government's Role in the Killing of Jamal Khashoggi" stated that, "We assess that Saudi Arabia's Crown Prince Muhammad bin Salman approved an operation in Istanbul, Turkey to capture or kill Saudi journalist Jamal Khashoggi."

On 26 February 2021, the United Nations Special Rapporteur on extrajudicial, summary or arbitrary executions Agnès Callamard released a statement urging, "The United States Government should impose sanctions against the Crown Prince, as it has done for the other perpetrators targeting his personal assets but also his international engagements."

On 18 November 2022, due to his new role as the Saudi prime minister, Mohammed got US immunity over Khashoggi's murder. However, Biden's administration emphasized that this was not a determination of innocence.

Intimidation of Saad al-Jabri
On 9 July 2020, four United States senators urged President Trump to secure the freedom of Saad al-Jabri's children Omar and Sarah, calling it a "moral obligation" to support a man who aided the U.S. intelligence for years and had close ties with key members of the Saudi royal family. The Saudi government detained Omar and Sarah in March 2020 and, to date, their whereabouts remain unknown. Saudi Arabia had issued an extradition request and Interpol notices to bring back Saad al-Jabri, who was the U.S. anti-terrorism contact in the Middle East and was staying in Canada since 2018. The Interpol notice against al-Jabri was removed, citing that he was a political opponent of Mohammed.

In August 2020, al-Jabri filed a federal lawsuit in Washington, D.C., alleging that Mohammed dispatched a "Tiger Squad" to Canada during October 2018 to assassinate al-Jabri, who was the closest adviser to Mohammed's chief rival, former crown prince Muhammad bin Nayef. The squad was identified and returned by Canadian authorities. Following the lawsuit, the U.S. District Court for the District of Columbia issued the summons against Mohammed bin Salman, along with 11 other people. The summons stated that a judgement would be taken by default against the concerned parties if they fail to respond. Documents filed to the U.S. federal court revealed that Mohammed was served the lawsuit on 22 September 2020 at 4:05 p.m. ET via WhatsApp, and twenty minutes later the message was marked as "read".

Relations with China 

Relations between China and Saudi Arabia have deepened under the leadership of Mohammed; since he became crown prince in 2017, trade between the two countries have increased from $51.5 billion to $87.5 billion in 2021. In February 2019, Mohammed defended China's policies in Xinjiang, where more than 1 million Uyghurs were put into internment camps, saying "China has the right to carry out anti-terrorism and de-extremisation work for its national security.". Miqdaad Versi, spokesperson for the Muslim Council of Britain, called Mohammed's remarks "disgusting" and a defence of "the use of concentration camps against Uighur Muslims".

Mohammed hosted Chinese leader Xi Jinping in Riyadh for talks on 7-10 December 2022. During the visit, Xi met with numerous Arab leaders, including members of the Gulf Cooperation Council. Xi also signed numerous commercial deals with Saudi Arabia and formally elevated the relationship to comprehensive strategic partnership, highest level in China's formal ranking of relations with other countries. On 10 March 2023, Saudi Arabia and Iran agreed to restore diplomatic ties cut in 2016 after a deal brokered between the two countries by China following secret talks in Beijing.

Hack of Jeff Bezos's phone

In March 2019, Gavin de Becker, a security specialist working for Jeff Bezos, accused Saudi Arabia of hacking Bezos's phone. Bezos was the owner of The Washington Post, the leader of the company Amazon, and the world's richest man at the time.

In January 2020, the results of FTI Consulting's forensic investigation of Bezos' phone were made public. The company concluded with "medium to high confidence" that Bezos' phone was hacked by a multimedia message sent in May 2018 from Mohammed's WhatsApp account, after which the phone begun transmitting dramatically higher amounts of data. The report points to circumstantial evidence: first, a November 2018 message from Mohammed to Bezos includes an image resembling the woman Bezos was having an affair with, despite the affair not being public knowledge at the time; second, a February 2019 text from Mohammed to Bezos urges Bezos not to believe everything, after Bezos was briefed on the phone regarding an Internet campaign against him conducted by Saudis.

United Nations special rapporteurs Agnès Callamard and David Kaye reacted that the alleged hack suggests that Mohammed participated "in an effort to influence, if not silence, The Washington Post'''s reporting on Saudi Arabia". They declared that the alleged hacking was relevant to the issue of whether Prince Mohammed was involved in the killing of Jamal Khashoggi, who worked for The Washington Post.

 Environmentalism 
Under Mohammed's leadership, Saudi Arabia has lobbied to weaken global carbon emissions-reduction agreements. Domestically, Saudi Arabia has a track record of making bold announcements about environmental efforts which do not pan out.

Personal life

On 6 April 2008 Mohammed married his first cousin Sara bint Mashour, a daughter of his paternal uncle Mashour bin Abdulaziz. Prince Mohammed and Princess Sara have five children; the first four were named after their grandparents, and the fifth one is named after his great-grandfather King Abdulaziz, the founder of Saudi Arabia. In 2022, The Economist reported that on at least one occasion, Mohammed beat his wife so severely that medical treatment was required.

In 2015, Mohammed purchased the Italian-built and Bermuda-registered yacht Serene from Russian vodka tycoon Yuri Shefler for €500 million. In 2015, he purchased the Château Louis XIV in France for over $300 million.

In December 2017, a number of sources reported that Mohammed, using his close associate Prince Badr bin Abdullah bin Mohammed Al Farhan as an intermediary, had bought Salvator Mundi by Leonardo da Vinci; the sale in November at $450.3 million set a new record price for a work of art. This report has been denied by the auctioneer Christie's, the Saudi Arabian embassy, and the UAE government, which has announced that it is the actual owner of the painting. The exact current location of the painting is unknown, as it has not been seen publicly since the auction. However, it has been suggested that Mohammed's yacht Serene houses Salvator Mundi''.

Mohammed has travelled extensively around the world, meeting with politicians, business leaders and celebrities. In June 2016, he travelled to Silicon Valley and met key people in the U.S. high tech industry, including Facebook founder Mark Zuckerberg. In early 2018, he visited the United States, where he met with many politicians, business people and Hollywood stars, including then-President Trump, Bill and Hillary Clinton, Henry Kissinger, Michael Bloomberg, George W. Bush, George H. W. Bush, Bill Gates, Jeff Bezos, Oprah Winfrey, Rupert Murdoch, Richard Branson, Mayor Eric Garcetti of Los Angeles, Michael Douglas, Morgan Freeman, and Dwayne Johnson. Trump praised his relationship with Mohammed. The prince also visited the United Kingdom, where he met with Prime Minister Theresa May, Queen Elizabeth II and Prince William, Duke of Cambridge.

In 2018, Mohammed's personal net worth was estimated at US$3.0 billion.

On 25 December 2020, as part of the Saudi Arabian Ministry of Health's national COVID-19 vaccination plan, the Crown Prince was shown receiving the vaccine in a video released by the Saudi Press Agency.

In December 2020, Mohammed invested money into Take-Two Interactive, Electronic Arts, and Activision Blizzard through Saudi Arabia's sovereign wealth fund. The investments amounted to 14.9 million shares in Activision Blizzard, 7.4 million shares in Electronic Arts, and 3.9 million shares in Take-Two Interactive. Mohammed has stated that he grew up playing video games.

On 19 November 2022, Mohammed was awarded an honorary doctorate from Kasetsart University in the field of land knowledge for sustainable development.

Honours 
:
 Member Exceptional Class of the Order of Sheikh Isa bin Salman Al Khalifa (25 November 2018)
:
  Grand Cordon of the Order of the Republic (28 November 2018)
:
  Nishan-e-Pakistan (18 February 2019)
:
 Civil First Class of the Order of Oman (7 December 2021)
:
 Collar of the Order of Zayed (7 December 2021)
:
  Collar of the Order of Al-Hussein bin Ali (21 June 2022)

See also 
 List of current heirs apparent

References

External links

 
 
 
 

|-

|-

1985 births
Living people
21st-century Saudi Arabian politicians
Anti-Iranian sentiments
Articles containing video clips
Children of Salman of Saudi Arabia
Crown Princes of Saudi Arabia
Defense ministers of Saudi Arabia
Foreign recipients of the Nishan-e-Pakistan
Government ministers of Saudi Arabia
King Saud University alumni
Muslim monarchs
People from Riyadh
Prime Ministers of Saudi Arabia
Saudi Arabian billionaires
Saudi Arabian nationalists
Saudi Arabian Sunni Muslims
Saudi Arabian princes